Buddleja hatschbachii is a rare species found only in the wet ravines and rock slopes flanking the east side of the planalto of southern Brazil. The species was first described and named by Norman &  Smith in 1976.

Description
Buddleja hatschbachii is a hermaphroditic subshrub 1 m high with brownish bark. The young branches are quadrangular, and covered with a whitish tomentum, bearing sessile  lanceolate leaves 10 – 16 cm long by 2.5 – 4.5 cm wide, membranaceous, glabrescent above, and lanose below. The cream or white inflorescence is 10 – 20 cm long. The sessile perfect flowers occur in pairs of cymes, each with 3 – 12 flowers, borne in the axils of the reduced leaves or bracts. The tubular corolla is 15 – 20 mm long.

Cultivation
The shrub is not known to be in cultivation.

References

hatschbachii
Flora of Brazil
Flora of South America